The third USS Uncas (SP-689), later USS SP-689, was an armed motorboat that served in the United States Navy as a patrol vessel from 1917 to 1918.
 
Uncas was built as a wooden-hulled civilian motorboat in 1917 by the Greenport Basin and Construction Company at Greenport on Long Island, New York. The U.S. Navy acquired her from her owner, Charles L. Poor of New York City, on 28 June 1917 for use as a patrol boat during World War I. She was commissioned the same day as USS Uncas (SP-689).

Assigned to the 3rd Naval District, Uncas conducted local patrol operations in the New York City area out of Section Base No. 6 at Bath Beach, Brooklyn, New York, for the duration of the war. In April 1918, her name was changed to USS SP-689 to avoid confusion with the tug USS Uncas, which was in commission at the same time.

SP-689 was returned to her owner on 31 December 1918.

References

Department of the Navy Naval Historical Center Online Library of Selected Images: U.S. Navy Ships: USS Uncas (SP-689), 1917-1918. Later renamed SP-689. Originally the civilian motorboat Uncas
NavSource Online: Section Patrol Craft Photo Archive: Uncas (SP 689)

Patrol vessels of the United States Navy
World War I patrol vessels of the United States
Ships built in Greenport, New York
1917 ships